André Maurice Fouache (20 October 1892 – 1 September 1982) was a French hurdler. He competed in the men's 400 metres hurdles at the 1924 Summer Olympics.

References

External links
 

1892 births
1982 deaths
Athletes (track and field) at the 1924 Summer Olympics
French male hurdlers
Olympic athletes of France
Place of birth missing
20th-century French people